Tiara Rosalia Nuraidah (born 27 June 1993) is an Indonesian doubles badminton player. She was the girls' doubles gold medalist at the 2011 Asian Junior Championships. She also won the women's doubles title at the Indonesia International Challenge back to back in 2014 and 2015 with different partners.

Achievements

Asian Championships 
Women's doubles

BWF World Junior Championships 
Girls' doubles

Mixed doubles

Asian Junior Championships 
Girls' doubles

Mixed doubles

BWF Grand Prix (1 runner-up) 
The BWF Grand Prix had two levels, the Grand Prix and Grand Prix Gold. It was a series of badminton tournaments sanctioned by the Badminton World Federation (BWF) and played between 2007 and 2017.

Women's doubles

  BWF Grand Prix Gold tournament
  BWF Grand Prix tournament

BWF International Challenge/Series (5 titles, 3 runners-up) 
Women's doubles

Mixed doubles

  BWF International Challenge tournament
  BWF International Series tournament

Invitational Tournament 
Women's doubles

Performance timeline

National team 
 Junior level

 Senior level

Individual competitions 
 Junior level

 Senior level

References

External links 

 

1993 births
Living people
People from Garut
Sportspeople from West Java
Indonesian female badminton players
Badminton players at the 2014 Asian Games
Asian Games competitors for Indonesia
Competitors at the 2013 Southeast Asian Games
Southeast Asian Games competitors for Indonesia
20th-century Indonesian women
21st-century Indonesian women